Jameh Mosque of Germi is a religious building in Germi that has been renovated in recent years.

References

Mosques in Ardabil Province
Mosque buildings with domes
National works of Iran
Germi